The Emax was a line of samplers, developed, manufactured, and sold by E-mu Systems from 1986 to 1995. Sold alongside their more expensive Emulator II and III samplers, the Emax line was conceived after the release of the Akai S-612 and Sequential Prophet 2000, and was designed to compete for the lower end of the sampling market.

The name Emax can refer to one of two specific models, the Emax (which was grey), and the Emax II (which was black). The Emax is sometimes referred to as the Emax I or the Emax 1000 to avoid confusion between the two models (although E-mu Systems never referred to it this way, there is an internal control label that says EMAX 1000 inside every unit).

Emax
The original Emax was released in 1986, as a low cost version of the Emulator II. The base model cost $2,995; a rack version was also available for $2,695. Although it was fairly similar to the Emulator II in sampling specifications, the Emax used much more reliable parts, and stored sounds on 3½" floppy disks, as opposed to the more antiquated 5¼" floppy disks that the Emulator used. The Emax was advertised as a 12-bit sampler, which was, in reality, only half-true; although playback was 12-bit, only 8 bits were used to store each sample. While this led some to regard the Emax as inferior to its competitors, many modern users consider it to be a key part of the Emax's sound.

Several upgrades were available for the Emax during its lifetime. The Emax HD featured a 20 megabyte hard drive for storing samples. The Emax SE added an additive synthesis engine that let the user create sounds from scratch. The Emax Plus added external SCSI device capability in addition to the other updates.

Sample memory remained the same at 512 KB for all models. SCSI can be retrofitted to second and third revision motherboards and was standard on the final model the Plus. The Emax was discontinued in 1989 and replaced by Emax-II

Emax II

The Emax was replaced in 1989 by the Emax II and Emax II Turbo. Although the Emax II was a true 16-bit sampler with more polyphony, it also used digital filters and components, which sounded noticeably different from the original's analogue filter chips. The Emax II also sported a noticeably higher pricetag; a base model cost $3,595, while a fully expanded model could cost as much as $8,000. Nevertheless, the Emax II found a niche among many professionals due to its large and varied sample library, and it enjoyed the longest production run of any E-mu product.

The EMAX II has different versions, labeled between 2201 and 2214, including mono and stereo versions. The Emax II Turbo, released in 1990, added more built-in sample memory (8 Mb from factory) and an internal SCSI Hard Disk.

In 1995, the Emax II was discontinued, replaced by the rackmountable ESi-32, and later the ESI-4000 and the ESI-2000.

Notable users
 Alphaville - Emax
 Beastie Boys - on Paul's Boutique
 Cabaret Voltaire
 Depeche Mode - all three keyboard players can be seen operating Emax keyboards on their 1989 live film, 101, and Emax II keyboards in the Devotional film.
 Faith No More - Can be seen in the "Epic", "Falling to Pieces" and other videos
 Fear Factory - Used an Emax during their performance at Dynamo Open Air in 1993 (particularly during the song "Scapegoat")
 Ice MC - Can be seen in the "Easy" video
 Johnny Hates Jazz - Emax used on Turn Back the Clock (album) 
 KMFDM - Used an Emax
 Los Prisioneros
 Manufacture 
 Mats/Morgan Band - Emax II
 Minimal Compact
 Meat Beat Manifesto
 Mouse on Mars
 Nine Inch Nails - used an Emax SE extensively on Pretty Hate Machine
 Die Krupps - Emax II
 Orbital
 Saint Etienne - credited with using the Emax on their 1991 album "Foxbase Alpha"
 Skinny Puppy
 Steve Roach
 Tony Toni Tone
 Little Angels - Jimmy Dickinson used an Emax SE on all Little Angels records including their number 1 Jam (album)
 Tyske Ludder - Emax II
 U2
 Tom Waits - credited with using the Emax on his 1993 album "The Black Rider"
 The Whispers
 The Wiggles - credited with using the Emax on their 1991 album "The Wiggles"
 White Town - Emax II extensively used on Your Woman

References

Samplers (musical instrument)
E-mu synthesizers